Hexigten Banner is a banner of Inner Mongolia, China under the jurisdiction of Chifeng, bordering Hebei province to the south. In 1690 the Battle of Ulan Butung between Qing and Dzungar forces took place here.

Etymology

It was named after the Khishigten Mongol clan, who were considered to be the descendants of the Kheshig, the imperial guard of the Mongol Empire.

Demographics

There are 8 main ethnic groups (i.e. Han, Mongol, Hui, Manchu, Daur, Korean, Dong and Zhuang). The Mongols are of the Hishigten division.

Climate

Transport
China National Highway 303
China National Highway 306
Hanbai Highway
Jitong Railway

Economy
The main industries are mining, renewable energy, tourism, and stock breeding. From 2006 to 2008, Hexigten ranked No. 1 for 3 consecutive years in wind power production among all the counties of China with 532 wind turbines installed in 2008, totally installed generating capacity of 525 megawatt and annual energy generation of 1124 GWh.

Sights
 Heshigten Global Geopark is one of the UNESCO Global Geoparks. Its 1,750 km2 area is contained in eight separate areas of scenic beauty and geologic significance, including volcanic, glacial, and desert features.

References

External links

 Official site of Hexigten Qi

Banners of Inner Mongolia
Chifeng